Tanto is the second studio album by Spanish singer-songwriter Pablo Alborán. It was released in Spain on 6 November 2012. The album peaked at number one in Spain and Portugal. Tanto is the follow-up to Alborán's debut album Pablo Alborán (2011). Tanto was re-released in November 2013 and features new tracks and a 30-minute documentary DVD.

Singles
 "Tanto" was released on 9 September 2012 as the lead single from the album. It peaked to number two on the Spanish Singles Chart.
 "El Beso" was released in December 2012 as the second single. It peaked at number one on the Spanish singles chart in February 2013.
 "Quién" was released in April 2013 as the third single from the album.  It peaked at number one on the Spanish singles chart in May 2013.
 "Éxtasis" was released in August 2013 as the fourth single from the album. It peaked at number 16 on the Spanish singles chart in September 2013.
 "Dónde está el Amor" was released in September as the fifth and final single from the album. It peaked at number 32 on the Spanish singles chart in February 2014.

Track listing

Charts

Weekly charts

Year-end charts

Certifications

Release history

References

2012 albums
Pablo Alborán albums